The Vörå runes (Swedish: ,) were found in the municipality of Vörå, Finland. between 1978 and 1982. They are rock carvings, found in two separate locations, in an area of marsh and forest area of approximately 7–9 km from the municipal centre of Vörå. The engravings include a cross and a picture of the ship. In the 1980s the National Board of Antiquities estimated that they are not from the Viking era, but are likely to be fakes, and no more than 100–200 years old, as the Vörå engravings shape differ from the typical runes.

References

External links
 Video showing site and carvings

Runestones in Finland
Archaeological forgeries